The alpine cool-skink (Carinascincus greeni) is a species of skink in the family Scincidae.  It is endemic to Australia, found in Tasmania.

References

Carinascincus
Skinks of Australia
Endemic fauna of Australia
Reptiles described in 1975
Taxa named by Peter Alan Rawlinson